Abraham Nova (born January 14, 1994) is a Puerto Rican-born American professional boxer who has held the WBA-NABA super featherweight title since 2018.

Early life
Abraham Nova was born on January 14, 1994, in Carolina, Puerto Rico, to Dominican parents. He moved to the U.S. with his parents and nine siblings when he was an infant, with all twelve family members living in a two-bedroom apartment in Albany, New York. He began boxing at the age of 12, going on to compile an amateur record of 167–11–60KOs before turning professional.

Professional career
Nova made his professional debut on April 29, 2016, scoring a first-round technical knockout (TKO) victory over Weusi Johnson at the Trump Taj Mahal in Atlantic City, New Jersey.

After compiling a record of 12–0 (10 KOs) he faced Sulaiman Segawa for the vacant WBA-NABA super featherweight title on November 18, 2018, at the Royale Nightclub in Boston, Massachusetts. Nova defeated Sulaiman via unanimous decision (UD) to capture his first professional title, with one judge scoring the bout 97–93 and the other two scoring it 96–93. After two wins in non-title fights – a UD against Brian Pelaez in December 2018 and a TKO against Mario Lozano in May 2019 – he made the first defence of his WBA-NABA title against Luis Castillo on August 23, 2019, at the Encore Boston Harbor in Everett, Massachusetts. With less than 30 seconds remaining in the first round, Nova landed a left-jab right-hand combination to drop Castillo to the canvas. Castillo was unable to make it to his feet before the referee's count of ten, awarding Nova a first-round knockout (KO) victory.

Nova was booked to face Pedro Navarrete in a non-title bout on January 18, 2020. He won the fight by a fourth-round technical knockout. Nova faced Avery Sparrow on June 25, 2020. He won the fight by unanimous decision, with scores of 99–91, 97–93 and 96–94. Nova was scheduled to face the journeyman Richard Pumicpic on the Joshua Franco vs Andrew Moloney III undercard on August 14, 2021. He won the fight by unanimous decision, with one judge scoring the fight 78–74 for him, while the remaining two judges scored the fight 79–73 in his favor. Nova faced Willam Encarnación on January 15, 2022, in the Joe Smith Jr. vs Steve Geffrard WBO co-headliner. He won the fight by an eight-round technical knockout.

Professional boxing record

References

External links

Living people
1994 births
American male boxers
People from Carolina, Puerto Rico
Puerto Rican male boxers
Super-featherweight boxers
Lightweight boxers
Puerto Rican people of Dominican Republic descent
Sportspeople from Albany, New York